Nahachiv  is a village (selo) in Yavoriv Raion, Lviv Oblast, in southwest Ukraine. It belongs to Yavoriv urban hromada, one of the hromadas of Ukraine. Its population is 3,738. Local government – Nahachivska Village Council.

History
The first historical mention of Nahachiv fixed in the 1456, but there were older  - 12 - 13th century. 

In territory of village are preserved the ancient fortress mounts 6 - 7th century. The oldest findings from the area are Palaeolithic (old Stone Age) is a stone ax.

Notes

References 
 weather.in.ua
 Іісторія села Нагачів  
 Церква св.Симеона Стовпника (с.Нагачів, Львівська обл.): карта, фото 

Villages in Yavoriv Raion